Trevenzuolo is a comune with 2,431 inhabitants in the province of Verona. A Roman bronze figure of a lady was found in the village in the nineteenth century and is now in the British Museum.

References

Cities and towns in Veneto